Kaptis Hydroelectric Power Station, also Kaptis Power Station, is a planned hydroelectric power plant in Kenya, with generation capacity of .

Location

Overview
Kaptis Power Station is an independent power project, under development by a consortium comprising (a) Tembo Power, based in Ebene, Mauritius (b) Metier Private Equity International, a company based in Sandhurst, Gauteng, South Africa and (c) WK Construction, a South African engineering and construction company, based in Johannesburg. The consortium that is developing the power station, also owns it, as outlined in the table below.

Funding
The run-of-the-river hydroelectric power plant is budgeted to cost US$44 million. The owner/developers of the power station will raise US$14 million in equity financing. The remaining US$30 million will be borrowed as arranged by the selected financial arranger, the Emerging Africa Infrastructure Fund, a subsidiary of the Private Infrastructure Development Group.

In April 2020, it was announced that the US$30 million loan would be provided jointly by the Finnish Fund for Industrial Cooperation Limited (Finnfund) and Ninety One SA (formerly Investec Asset Management), a subsidiary of the Emerging Africa Infrastructure Fund (EAIF).

Construction
It is anticipated that the project will reach financial close and construction will begin in the fourth quarter of 2020. Commercial commissioning is expected in the second half of 2022. WK Construction is expected to be the preferred civil works contractor.

See also

 List of power stations in Kenya

References

Dams in Kenya
Hydroelectric power stations in Kenya
Buildings and structures in Kenya
Kakamega County
Vihiga County